Shiyali Ramamrita Ranganathan ( 9 August 1892 – 27 September 1972) was a librarian and mathematician from India. His most notable contributions to the field were his five laws of library science and the development of the first major faceted classification system, the colon classification. He is considered to be the father of library science, documentation, and information science in India and is widely known throughout the rest of the world for his fundamental thinking in the field. His birthday is observed every year as the National Librarian Day in India.

He was a university librarian and professor of library science at Banaras Hindu University (1945–47) and professor of library science at the University of Delhi (1947–55). The last appointment made him director of the first Indian school of librarianship to offer higher degrees. He was president of the Indian Library Association from 1944 to 1953. In 1957 he was elected an honorary member of the International Federation for Information and Documentation (FID) and was made a vice-president for life of the Library Association of Great Britain.

Early life and education
Ranganathan was born on 9 August 1892 in Siyali, Thanjavur, Tamil Nadu in an orthodox Hindu Brahmin family. His birth date is also written 12 August 1892 but he himself wrote his birth date 9 August 1892 in his book,  The Five Laws of Library Science.

Ranganathan began his professional life as a mathematician; he earned B.A. and M.A. degrees in mathematics from Madras Christian College in his home province, and then went on to earn a teaching license. His lifelong goal was to teach mathematics, and he was successively a member of the mathematics faculties at universities in Mangalore, Coimbatore and Madras. As a mathematics professor, he published papers mainly on the history of mathematics. His career as an educator was somewhat hindered by stammering (a difficulty he gradually overcame in his professional life). The Government of India awarded Padmashri to Dr. S.R. Ranganathan in 1957 for valuable contributions to Library Science.

Early career

In 1923, the University of Madras created the post of University Librarian to oversee their poorly organized collection. Among the 900 applicants for the position, none had any formal training in librarianship, and Ranganathan's handful of papers satisfied the search committee's requirement that the candidate should have a research background. His sole knowledge of librarianship came from an Encyclopædia Britannica article he read days before the interview. Ranganathan was initially reluctant to pursue the position (he had forgotten about his application by the time he was called for an interview there). To his own surprise, he received the appointment and accepted the position in January 1924.

At first, Ranganathan found the solitude of the position was intolerable. In a matter of weeks, complaining of total boredom, he went back to the university administration to beg for his teaching position back. A deal was struck that Ranganathan would travel to London to study contemporary Western practices in librarianship, and that, if he returned and still rejected librarianship as a career, the mathematics lectureship would be his again.

Ranganathan travelled to University College London, which at that time housed the only graduate degree program in library science in Britain. At University College, he earned marks only slightly above average, but his mathematical genius latched onto the problem of classification, a subject typically taught by rote in library programs of the time. As an outsider, he focused on what he perceived to be flaws with the popular decimal classification, and began to explore new possibilities on his own.

He also devised the Acknowledgment of Duplication, which states that any system of classification of information necessarily implies at least two different classifications for any given datum. He anecdotally proved this with the Dewey Decimal Classification (DDC) by taking several books and showing how each might be classified with two totally different resultant DDC numbers. For example, a book on "warfare in India" could be classified under "warfare" or "India". Even a general book on warfare could be classified under "warfare", "history", "social organisation", "Indian essays", or many other headings, depending upon the viewpoint, needs, and prejudices of the classifier. To Ranganathan, a structured, step-by-step system acknowledging each facet of the topic of the work was immensely preferable to the anarchy and "intellectual laziness" (as he termed it) of the DDC. Given the poor technology for information retrieval available at that time, the implementation of this concept was a tremendous step forwards for the science of information retrieval.

He began drafting the system that was ultimately to become colon classification while in England, and refined it as he returned home, even going so far as to reorder the ship's library on the voyage back to India. He initially got the idea for the system from seeing a set of Meccano in a toy store in London. Ranganathan returned with great interest for libraries and librarianship and a vision of its importance for the Indian nation. The system remains useful even into the modern times. He returned to and held the position of University Librarian at the University of Madras for twenty years. During that time, he helped to found the Madras Library Association, and lobbied actively for the establishment of free public libraries throughout India and for the creation of a comprehensive national library.

Ranganathan was considered by many to be a workaholic. During his two decades in Madras, he consistently worked 13-hour days, seven days a week, without taking a vacation for the entire time. Although he married in November 1928, he returned to work the afternoon following the marriage ceremony. A few years later, he and his wife Sarada had a son. The couple remained married until Ranganathan's death.

The first few years of Ranganathan's tenure at Madras were years of deliberation and analysis as he addressed the problems of library administration and classification. It was during this period that he produced what have come to be known as his two greatest legacies: his five laws of library science (1931) and the colon classification system (1933).

Regarding the political climate at the time, Ranganathan took his position at the University of Madras in 1924. Gandhi had been imprisoned in 1922 and was released around the time that Ranganathan was taking that job. Ranganathan sought to institute massive changes to the library system and to write about such things as open access and education for all which essentially had the potential to enable the masses and encourage civil discourse (and disobedience). Although there is no evidence that Ranganathan did any of this for political reasons, his changes to the library had the result of educating more people, making information available to all, and even aiding women and minorities in the information-seeking process.

The Northern Ireland crisis got an unexpected metaphorical reference in a book by S. R. Ranganathan, as "making an Ulster of the ... law of parsimony", complaining about the harmful effects of low budget on the good functioning of a library.

Later career

After two decades of serving as librarian at Madras – a post he had intended to keep until his retirement, Ranganathan retired from his position after conflicts with a new university vice-chancellor became intolerable. At the age of 54, he submitted his resignation and, after a brief bout with depression, accepted a professorship in library science at Banaras Hindu University in Varanasi, his last formal academic position, in August 1945. There, he catalogued the university's collection; by the time he left four years later, he had classified over 100,000 items personally.

Ranganathan headed the Indian Library Association from 1944 to 1953, but was never a particularly adept administrator, and left amid controversy when the Delhi Public Library chose to use the Dewey Decimal Classification system instead of his own Colon Classification. He held an honorary professorship at Delhi University from 1949 to 1955 and helped build that institution's library science programs with S. Dasgupta, a former student of his. While at Delhi, Ranganathan drafted a comprehensive 30-year plan for the development of an advanced library system for the whole of India. In 1951, Ranganathan released an album on Folkways Records entitled, Readings from the Ramayana: In Sanskrit Bhagavad Gita.

Ranganathan briefly moved to Zurich, Switzerland, from 1955 to 1957, when his son married a European woman; the unorthodox relationship did not sit well with Ranganathan, although his time in Zurich allowed him to expand his contacts within the European library community, where he gained a significant following. However, he soon returned to India and settled in the city of Bangalore, where he spent the rest of his life. While in Zurich, though, he endowed a professorship at Madras University in honour of his wife of thirty years, largely as an ironic gesture in retaliation for the persecution he suffered for many years at the hands of that university's administration.

Ranganathan's final major achievement was the establishment of the Documentation Research and Training Centre as a department and research centre in the Indian Statistical Institute in Bangalore in 1962, where he served as honorary director for five years. In 1965, the Indian government honoured him for his contributions to the field with a rare title of "National Research Professor."

In the final years of his life, Ranganathan suffered from ill health and was largely confined to his bed. On 27 September 1972, he finally succumbed to complications from bronchitis.

Upon the 1992 centenary of his birth, several biographical volumes and collections of essays on Ranganathan's influence were published in his honour. Ranganathan's autobiography, published serially during his life, is titled A Librarian Looks Back.

Influence and legacy
Ranganathan dedicated his book The Five Laws of Library Science to his maths tutor at Madras Christian College, Edward Burns Ross. His birthday, August 12, has been denoted National Librarians' Day in India.

See also
 Colon classification
 Faceted classification
 Five laws of library science
 Madras Public Libraries Act
 Subject (documents)

References

Cited sources
 Srivastava, A. P. (1977). Ranganathan: A pattern maker. New Delhi: Metropolitan Book Co.

External links

 Portal on Dr. S R Ranganathan from India
 Ranganathan for Information Architects by Mike Steckel
 Ranganathan's Monologue on Melvil Dewey, Recorded 1964 – transcript
 India's First IT Guru
 S.R. Ranganathan (1892–1972): Google Scholar Profile
 Ranganathan- Profile in Brief
 Full-view works by S.R. Ranganathan at HathiTrust Digital Library.

1892 births
1972 deaths
20th-century Indian mathematicians
Academic librarians
Indian librarians
Librarianship and human rights
Library science scholars
People from Mayiladuthurai district
Recipients of the Padma Shri in literature & education
Scientists from Tamil Nadu
University of Madras alumni